The 2000–01 Belgian Cup was the 46th season of the main knockout competition in Belgian association football, the Belgian Cup.

Final rounds
The final phase started in the round of 32 when all clubs from the first division entered the competition (18 clubs plus 14 clubs from the qualifications). All rounds were played in one leg except for the semifinals (in two legs) and the quarter-finals (in one leg with replay). The final game was played at the Heysel Stadium in Brussels, in which Westerlo won 1-0 against Lommel.

Bracket

* after extra time
+ replay

References

Belgian Cup seasons
Cup